Hindustani (Hindi and Urdu) verbs conjugate according to mood, tense, person and number. Hindustani inflection is markedly simpler in comparison to Sanskrit, from which Hindustani has inherited its verbal conjugation system (through Prakrit). Aspect-marking participles in Hindustani mark the aspect. Gender is not distinct in the present tense of indicative mood, but all the participle forms agree with the gender and number of the subject. Verbs agree with the gender of the subject or the object depending on whether the subject pronoun is in the dative or ergative case (agrees with the object) or the nominative case (agrees with the subject).

Overview

Verbs 
In Hindustani, all verbs have a base form called the infinitive which is marked by the -nā  ending of verbs. Some of the most common verbs are: honā (to be), karnā (to do), rêhnā (to stay), calnā (to walk), bolnā (to speak).

Complex verbs 
Hindustani is extremely rich in complex verbs formed by the combinations of noun/adjective and a verb. Complex verbs are of two types: transitive and intransitive.

 The transitive verbs are obtained by combining nouns/adjectives with verbs such as karnā ‘to do’, lenā ‘to take’, denā ‘to give’, jītnā ‘to win’ etc. 
 The intransitive verbs are formed with the help of verbs such as honā ‘to be/happen’, lagnā ‘to feel’, ānā ‘to come’ etc.

Complex verbs (Complex predicates) are of the following three combinations:

 Noun + Verb
 Adjective + Verb
 Verb + Verb

where the noun, adjective or the first verb contributes the semantic content and the verb or second verb accounts for the syntactic information of the construction. Noun/adjective and verb combinations are termed conjunct verbs, as in (1) and (2) in the examples below whereas the combinations of two verbs are called compound verbs, as in the example (3) below:

In the above examples, there are verbal constructions which can be grouped into two categories of complex verbs, namely, conjunct verbs and compound verbs. (1) and (2) are examples of conjunct verbs since in (1) we find a noun kām ‘work’ and a perfective form of the verb karnā, ‘do’ whereas in (2) the verbal predicate exhibits a complex construction made of two elements, namely an adjective sāf ‘clean’ plus a verb karnā, ‘do’. The example in (3), on the other hand, is considered be compound verbs since the predicates exhibits two or more than two verbal elements, bōl ‘tell’, dēnā ‘give’, and diyā 'gave'.

Aspects 
There are three primary grammatical aspects: habitual aspect, perfective aspect and progressive aspect. Periphrastic verb forms consist of two elements, the first of these two elements is the aspect marker and the second element is the tense-mood marker. These three aspects are formed from their participle forms being used with the copula verb (honā "to be"). However, the primary participles which mark the aspects can be modified periphrastically by adding auxiliary participles constructed from auxiliary verbs such as rêhnā (to stay/remain), ānā (to come), jānā (to go) after the primary participle to add a nuance to the aspect.

Habitual aspect 
The habitual aspect is marked using the habitual participle, which is constructed by taking the verb root and suffixing -tā to it. It declines according to gender and number of the subject asː -tā, -te, -tī, -tī̃ for masculine singular, masculine plural, feminine singular, feminine plural, respectively.

Perfective aspect 
The perfective aspect is marked using the perfective participle, which is constructed by taking the verb root and suffixing -ā to it. If the verb root ends in a vowel, then -yā is suffixed to the verb root instead. It declines according to gender and number of the subject asː -(y)ā, -(y)e, -(y)ī, -(y)ī̃ for masculine singular, masculine plural, feminine singular, feminine plural, respectively.

Progressive aspect 
Hindustani has distinct constructions to convey progressive and continuous actions. Progressive actions are marked through the progressive aspect participle rahā used along with the verb root, while the continuous action is conveyed through the perfective adjectival participle which is constructed by conjugating the verb into its perfective aspect participle and combining it with the perfective aspect participle of the verb honā (to be), which is huā. The verbs in the examples 1a and 2a below are in the progressive aspect while in 1b and 2b the verbs are in their perfective adjectival participle form.

Moods 
There are five grammatical moods which the three aspects can be put into. Moods in Hindustani are:

 Indicative mood
 Presumptive mood
 Subjunctive mood
 Regular Subjunctive
Present Subjunctive
Future Subjunctive
 Perfective Subjunctive
Future Subjunctive
 Counterfactual mood
Conditional
 Past subjunctive
 Imperative mood
 Present Imperative
 Future Imperative

Notes:

 When making an if-clause, the conditional mood is used in both apodosis and the protasis unlike other languages such as the ones in the Romance branch which make use of unique past-subjunctive and conditional verb forms in the apodosis and the protasis, respectively.
The regular future subjunctive is replaced by the perfective future subjunctive when an if-clause or a relative clause is used.

Set of related verbs 
Verbs are morphologically contrastive, leading to the existence of related verb sets divisible along such lines. While the derivation of different verb forms shows patterns, it does reach a level of variegation so as to make it somewhat difficult to outline all encompassing rules. Furthermore, some verb sets may have as many as four to five distinct members; also, the meaning of certain members of given sets may be idiosyncratic. These below are the verb forms that a verb can have —

 Intransitive
 Involitional  — these are actions that cannot be done intentionally.
Dative — these involitional verbs require the subject to be in the dative case.
Non-dative — these verbs require the subject to be in the nominative case.
 Volitional — these are actions that can be intentionally done.
 Ergative — these verbs require the subject to be in the ergative case in when the verb is in the perfective aspect.̟
 Non-ergative — these verbs always require the subject to be in the nominative case even when the verb is in perfective aspect.
 Transitive
 Direct — the subject itself experiences the action but the subject and the object are not the same
 Indirect — the subject imparts the action onto the object, the object is the experiencer of the action by the  usually translated into English as "to make (someone/something) verb"
 Reflexive —  the verb does action on the subject itself, the doer and experiencer of the action is the same subject
 Causative — the subject causes the action to happen

Starting from direct transitive verb forms, the other verb stems i.e., intransitive, causative, reflexive, indirect stems are produced according to these following (not exhaustive) assorted rules —

 Root vowel changeː
 a → ā
 u / ū → o
 i / ī → e
 Sometimes the root vowel change accompanies the root's final consonant changeː
 k → c
 ṭ → r̥
 l → Ø
 Suffixation of -ā to form the indirect or reflexive formː
 Root vowel changeː ū/o → u; e/ai/ā/ī → i
 Insertion of semivowel l between such vowel-terminating stems
 Suffixation of -vā (in place of -ā where it would occur) to form the causative verb stem

The meaning each verb in the verb set has is constructed from the direct form of the verb, for example: dekhnā (to see), dikhnā (to be seen), dikhānā (to make someone see; to show), dikhvānā (to cause to see). The table below shows some verbs and its verb set.

Verb conjugations 
There are four distinguished conjugation sets in Hindustani. The first person [1P] singular pronoun mãĩ, the second person [2P] singular intimate pronoun tū, the 2P plural familiar pronoun tum, and the 2P plural formal pronoun āp. The 1P plural pronoun ham and the 3P plural conjugations are the same as the conjugations of āp, and the 3P singular conjugations are the same as that of 2P singular pronoun tū. Hindi does not have 3P personal pronouns and instead the demonstrative pronouns (ye "this/these", vo "that/those") double as the 3P personal pronouns when they lack a noun argument.

There are very few irregular verbs. There are three types of irregularities that may occurː

 Irregular indicative perfect conjugationsː
 honā - to be; karnā - to do; denā - to give; lenā - to take; pīnā - to drink; jānā - to go
Irregular subjunctive conjugationsː
honā - to be; lenā - to take; denā - to give; pīnā - to drink; jīnā - to live
Irregular imperative conjugationsː
lēnā - to take; dēnā - to give; pīnā - to drink; jīnā - to live

Subjunctive mood conjugations 
Subjunctive mood can be put into two tenses: the present and future tense. The only verb that has both the present and future subjunctive conjugations is the verb honā "to be" while all the other verbs only have the future subjunctive conjugations.

Present regular subjunctive 
The present subjunctive conjugations for the verb honā "to be" are mentioned below. Present subjunctive conjugations of honā "to be" act as copulas that mark present subjunctive when used with aspectual participles.

Future regular subjunctive 
The future subjunctive forms are constructed the following way by adding the conjugational suffixes to the verb root. The future subjunctive conjugations for the regular verb bolnā "to speak" (the verb root is bol-) is shown below. Future subjunctive conjugations of honā "to be" and rêhnā "to stay" act as copulas that mark future subjunctive when used with aspectual participles.

There are a couple of verbs with irregular future subjunctive forms, they are mentioned below. Every monosyllabic verb root such as in pīnā "to drink", jīnā "to live" and sīnā "to sew" etc. change their long vowel ī to short vowel i when conjugated into future subjunctive.

Future perfective subjunctive 
(The conjugations for future perfective subjunctive are the same as past perfect conjugations and they are discussed in the past perfect section below)

There are two future subjunctive moods, first the regular subjunctive and the second, the perfective subjunctive which superficially has the same form as the perfect past forms of verbs but still expresses future events, it is only used with if clauses and relative clauses. In a semantic analysis, this use of the perfective aspect marker would not be considered perfective, since it is more closely related to subjunctive usage. Only the superficial form is identical to that of the perfective. This usage of perfective past as a future subjunctive is especially common colloquially; by describing the future action with a perfective verb and so stressing its completion.

Regular and perfective subjunctive usage 
The regular subjunctive when used implies that the event in question is not envisaged as definitely, but does not at all imply that it is unlikely to come about. It also expresses desire or wish.

 āp cāhẽ to ma͠i āpse hindi bolū̃gā. — "If you like, I'll speak Hindi with you".
 acchā rahegā agar āp āyẽ — It'll be better if you come.
 vo cāhtī hai ki ma͠i āū̃. — "she wants that I come."
 usne bolā ki tum nā jāo. — "s/he said (wanted) that you don't go."

The perfect future subjunctive either assumes that an event will definitely happen or the event is actually going to happen. Perfective future subjunctive are not used with events that are relatively unlikely happeningsː

 agar vo āye to mujhe usse milvānā. — Introduce me to him in case he comes.
 jab vo āye to mujhe usse milvānā. — Introduce me to him when he comes.

Usually with if-clauses using either the regular future subjunctive or the perfect future subjunctive will give grammatically correct sentences, the meanings however will be different. There's a nuance of precaution, and perfective (completed) action attached to the future perfective subjunctive, it is also used when giving out warnings, while the regular subjunctive expresses just a desire or wishː

 agar tūm kaho to ma͠i nahī̃ gāū̃gā — I won't sing if you say. (nuanceː "If you say so then I'll take your advice and won't sing.")
 agar tūmne kahā to ma͠i nahī̃ gāū̃gā —  I won't sing if you say (anything). (nuanceː "If you'd say anything to me, I won't sing at all.")

And usually replacing the perfective subjunctive with the regular subjunctive in relative clauses makes the sentence ungrammatical. However, replacing the perfective subjunctive with indicative future would still result in a grammatical sentence but with a different nuanceː

 jis din tum āye us din karū̃gā — I'll do it the day you come.
 *jis din tum āo us din karū̃gā — (intended) I'll do it the day you (will) come.
 jis din tum āoge us din karū̃gā — I'll do it the day you will come.

Indicative mood conjugations

Present tense 
The only verb in Hindustani that has indicative present tense forms is the verb honā "to be" and all other verbs lack this conjugation. Older forms of the language used to have present indicative forms but over time their meaning have change and now those forms are considered the future subjunctive forms which are discussed in the section above. These conjugations act as the present indicative copula with aspectual participles.

Indicative present tense conjugations of honā "to be" act as copulas that mark the indicative present tense when used with aspectual participles.

Perfect past tense 
The indicative perfect conjugations are derived from a participle and hence decline according to number and gender of the pronoun and not the pronoun itself. They are constructed by taking the verb root and adding the vowels -ā, -e, -ī, & -ī̃ respectively for masculine singular, masculine plural, feminine singular, and feminine plural. The perfect past conjugation also doubles as the perfective participle. Past perfect conjugations for the regular verb bolnā "to speak" (verb root is bol-) is shown below. Past perfect tense conjugations of honā "to be" and rêhnā "to stay" act as copulas that mark future perfective subjunctive when used with aspectual participles.

There are a couple of verbs that have irregular perfect past forms, these are mentioned belowː

Imperfect past tense 
The only verb in Hindustani that has indicative present tense forms is the verb honā "to be" and all other verbs lack this conjugation. These indicative imperfect forms of honā "to be" come from Sanskrit स्थित (stʰita) "standing, situated" which are derived from the PIE root *steh₂- (“to stand”). Imperfect past tense conjugations of honā "to be" act as copula that mark indicative imperfect past when used with aspectual participles.

Future tense 
The indicative future tense forms are constructed using the future subjunctive conjugations (which are discussed above) by adding the future marking suffix -gā that declines for the number and the gender of the noun that the pronoun refers to.

Presumptive mood conjugations 
The only verb that has presumptive mood conjugations is the verb honā "to be" and all other verbs lack this conjugation. These are constructed from the present subjunctive by adding the future suffix -gā. The same conjugation is used for all three tensesː present, past, and future. Presumptive mood conjugations of honā "to be" act as copulas that mark presumptive mood when used with aspectual participles.

Contrafactual mood conjugations 
Just like the indicative imperfect past and the indicative perfect past conjugations, the contrafactual mood conjugations are also derived from a participle form and declines the same way as them. It is constructed by taking the verb root and adding the suffix -tā to it which declines for number and gender of the noun that the pronoun refers to. Contrafactual mood conjugations for all verbs are regular. Contrafactual mood can only be used in the past tense as it expresses hypothetical scenarios that "could have" happened but didn't. It acts as both the past subjunctive and the past conditional. Contrafactual mood conjugations of honā "to be" and rêhnā "to stay" act as copulas that mark contrafactual mood when used with aspectual participles.

The participle that makes up the contrafactual mood conjugations also double as the habitual aspect participle.

Imperative mood conjugations 
The rules to form the imperatives areː Whenever a single-syllable verb root ends in the vowel -ī then the consonant -j- is added between the imperative conjugation suffix and the verb root.

 Intimate pronoun (tū)ː 
 Present imperative — The verb root is the imperative form. All the present imperatives for the pronoun tū are regular.
 Future imperative — The suffix -iyo is added to the verb root. For the verbs lenā and denā, the verb stem changes from le- and de- to just l- and d-, respectively. Hence forming the future imperatives diyo and liyo.
 Familiar pronoun (tum)ː
 Present imperative — The suffix -o (or -yo when the verb root ends in a vowel) is added to the verb root. For the verbs lenā and denā the verb root changes to l- and d-, respectively. Hence forming do and lo. For pīnā the stem changes to pi-. 
 Future imperative — The future imperative for tum is the same as the infintive form. All future imperative forms of tum are regular.
 Formal pronoun (āp)ː
 Present imperative — The suffix -iye is added to the verb root. Some verbs whose roots are one-syllabled and end in the vowel -ī or -i form the formal imperatives by adding the consonant -j- between the root and suffix as -j-iye.
 Future imperative — The future suffix -gā is added to the present imperative form for the pronoun āp. So, equivalently the suffix -iyegā is added to the verb root as suffix following the same rules as the present imperative for āp.

Participles 
There are two types of participles, aspectual participles which mark the aspect and non-aspectual participles which do not mark aspect. In the table below which mentions the different participles present in the language, ɸ denotes the verb root. The verb root ɸ for non-complex verbs is a single root however for complex verbs ɸ is in the form of ɸ1 + ɸ2 where ɸ2 acts like ɸ of the non-complex verbs which is declinable according to the aspect, for example, for the verb karnā ("to do") the root is kar and for the complex verb kar jānā (which is one of the perfective forms of "to do") the root is "kar jā-" where ɸ1 = kar and ɸ2 = jā.

Notes:

 ɸ-(y)ā denotes that when the verb root ɸ ends in a vowel, the consonant -y- is added, else it isn't.
 The participles which do not end in the vowel ā in their masculine singular form are cannot be declined according to gender or number, for example, the oblique infinitive and the progressive participle end in the vowel -e and hence have the same form for all gender and number combinations. Also, usually such participles do not take in the copula after them but instead a verb.
 Infinitive participles always use the dative pronouns as subjects, while other participles can have the nominative or the dative case pronouns as subjects, depending on the verb used. For example:
mujhe bolnā acchā lagtā hai. = I like to speak. ("bolnā" here is the infinitive participle, and not the infinitive. It agrees in gender and number with the direct object in the sentence. It takes the default masculine form when no object is present.)
ma͠i bolnā pasand kartā hū̃. = I like to speak. ("bolnā" here is the infinitive, and hence it cannot decline according to the gender and number)
mujhe bolne se thakān hotī hai. = I get tired because of speaking.
ma͠i bolne se thak jātā hū̃. = I get tired because of speaking.

Copulas and subaspects 
As discussed in the above section, there are three aspect marking participles which take in a copula in order to assign a grammatical mood and tense to the aspectual form. There are four verbs which can be used as the copula: honā (to be), rêhnā (to stay), ānā (to come), jānā (to go), and karnā (to do). Each of the four copulas provide a unique nuance to the aspect. The default (unmarked) copula is honā (to be). Below is a table showing the infinitive forms of each of the aspectual forms using different copulas:

The other copulas unlike honā (to be) can also again be put into their aspectul forms and then the copula honā (to be) is used to mark the tense and the mood, hence forming subaspects. However, these copulas cannot be put into all three aspects. It depends on the verb and also the copula itself what grammatical aspects can the copula can be put into. The following two tables show subaspectual forms for each of the three aspects.

1 When the copula jānā (to go) is used, only transitive and volitional intransitive verbs can be put into the habitual and perfective subaspect. So, *huā jātā honā and *huā gāyā honā are not valid constructions. However, somehow huā jā rahā honā is a valid construction but it means the same as hotā jā rahā honā which is the progressive subaspect of the habitual aspect using the copula jānā (shown below) but just emphasising the rate (shows its faster) at which the action is happening; progressive subaspects of the perfective aspect using jānā (to go) is often just the more emphasised version of the progressive subaspect of the habitual aspect using jānā (to go). marnā (to die) is intransitive but it is a volitional action especially when used metaphorically as in "pizzā khāne ke liye marā jā rahā hū̃" = "I am dying to eat a pizza". Other commonly used voliational usage of marnā (to die) is for e.g. "dying in a videogame".

2 The progressive subaspect of the perfective aspect can also use the copula rêhnā (to stay, remain) and it can be again conjugated into aspectual participle forms, hence forming what could be called a sub-sub-aspect. An example using habitual sub-subaspectː "jab bhī uske sāth bāhar jātī hū̃ vo marā jā rahā rêhtā hai pizzā khāne ke liye" = "Whenever I go out with him he always is (nuanceː I always find him) dying to eat a pizza". This sentence combines and mixes the nuances of all the three, perfective (main), progressive (sub), and habitual (subsub), aspects on the same verb marnā (to die).

Light verbs 
Compound verbs, a highly visible feature of Hindustani grammar, consist of a verbal stem plus a light verb. The light verb (also called "subsidiary", "explicator verb", and "vector") loses its own independent meaning and instead "lends a certain shade of meaning" to the main or stem verb, which "comprises the lexical core of the compound". While almost any verb can act as a main verb, there is a limited set of productive light verbs. Shown below are prominent such light verbs, with their independent meaning first outlined, followed by their semantic contribution as auxiliaries. Finally, having to do with the manner of an occurrence, compounds verbs are mostly used with completed actions and imperatives, and much less with negatives, conjunctives, and contexts continuous or speculative. This is because non-occurrences cannot be described to have occurred in a particular manner. The auxiliaries when combined with the main verb provides an aspectual sense to the main verb it modifies. Light verbs such as jānā "to go", ānā "to come", cuknā when combined with the main verb give the formed compound verb a perfective aspect, while retaining the original meaning of the main verb.

The first three light verbs in the above table are the most common of auxiliaries, and the "least marked", or "lexically nearly colourless". The nuance conveyed by an auxiliary can often be very subtle, and need not always be expressed with different words in English translation. lenā (to take) and denā (to give), transitive verbs, occur with transitives, while intransitive jānā (to go) occurs mostly with intransitives; a compound of a transitive and jānā (to go) will be grammatically intransitive as jānā (to go) is.

Ergativity and light verbs 
Hindustani is an aspectually split ergative language, with the ergative case marker, -ne, appearing on the subject of the transitive perfective clauses. A standard ergative construction is shown below — the verb is a transitive perfective participle, the subject carries the ergative case marker -ne, the object is unmarked and the participle agrees in gender with the object.

The light verb construction exemplified in (b) above has been has been studied extensively in Hindi linguistics. It is a two-verb sequence (referred to here as V1–v2) [bec = V1, lī = v2 ] in which the first verb (V1) is morphologically the bare stem and the second verb (v2) carries the usual clausal inflection. The V1 functions as the main verb, providing the bulk of meaning/thematic information, and the v2 is ‘‘relatively’’ light. This ‘‘light’’ v2 does provide certain subtle semantic information, mostly (though not entirely) aspectual/directional in nature.

Compound verbs and ergative marking 
Ergative case marking in compound verb constructions is affected by the transitivity of the v2. McGregor (1972:104) notes that ‘‘Compound verbs are used in construction with -ne when both the stem verb and the auxiliary (=v2) are themselves used independently with -ne.’’ Amritavalli (1979:77–78) comments ‘‘In sentences with compound verbs it is the transitivity (and perfectivity) of v2 that determines the ergative case-marking.’’ The basic pattern of compound verb constructions is given in (1a)–(1c) below.

Certain intransitive V1s do allow for ergative subjects when the light v2 is transitive. Intransitive V1s that permit ergative subjects with transitive v2’s belong to the unergative khā̃snā ‘‘to cough’’ class of verbs. Verbs in this class of intransitives independently permit ergative subjects and the choice of -ne subjects has been argued to be associated with properties of volitionality or conscious choice. Some other voliational (intransitive) verbs which allow ergative case assignment are bolnā "to speak", chī̃knā "to sneeze", cillānā  "to shout", nahānā "to take a bath" etc. In all these cases the agent has complete control and volition of the activity.

Examples in (1a)–(2b) show that V1v2 compound verb constructions allow ergative subjects when both V1 and v2, when functioning as main verbs, independently allow ergative subjects. Crucial evidence as to the source of ergativity in V1v2 constructions comes from pairings in which the case properties of the V1 are distinct from those of the v2. Though it is rare to find V1(intransitive)v2(transitive) sequences in which the V1 is not independently an ergative case licensing verbs, such examples do exist: cal denā ‘‘to move-give’’ (=move, depart), khisak lenā ‘‘to slip away-take’’ (=to slip away) and sarak lenā ‘‘crawl-take’’ (=to slip away/to move away). Interestingly, V1v2 sequences of this type do not permit ergative subjects, despite the ability of the v2 to license ergative subjects when functioning as main verbs.

Examples in (4a)-(4b) below show that the ergative case licensing property of the light v2 is nevertheless critical, as intransitive (usually unaccusative) v2’s never allow ergative subjects, regardless of the ergative case licensing properties of the V1.

Verb Paradigm

Non-personal Forms

Conjugation of verbs 
All the verbs except honā (to be) are defective and cannot be conjugated into the following moods and tenses in their non-aspectual forms (or simple aspect):

 present indicative
 imperfect indicative
 presumptive mood
 present subjunctive

The verb honā (to be) serves as the copula whose conjugations are used to form the three aspectual forms of verbs (habitual, perfective, and progressive). In the tables below all the conjugations of the copula are shown on the top and all the conjugations of the verb karnā (to do) (like which all other verbs behave) are shown on the bottom.

VERB CONJUGATIONS (NON-ASPECTUAL FORMS)

1 the second person pronouns tum, āp can be used both in singular and plural sense akin to the English second person pronoun "you".
2 the indicative future and presumptive future conjugations are often used synonymously.
3 the simple perfect verb forms when used in an if-cause or a relative clause, they would not be considered perfect indicative but instead a type of future subjunctive.

Aspectual form of verbs 
Using the three aspectual participles, the habitual, perfective, and the progressive aspectual forms are constructed. The aspectual forms for the verb karnā (to do) are shown in the table below:

References

Bibliography
 
 
 
 

Hindustani language
Indo-European verbs